Tom Hector W. Whiteley (born 17 December 1995) is an English rugby union scrum-half for Leicester Tigers in Premiership Rugby.

Whiteley began playing rugby for Rosslyn Park's junior sides age 7, he went to Millfield School and played full back in academy sides for Bristol and Harlequins but was considered too small and released. He switched to scrum-half and after impressing at the Rosslyn Park 7s tournament signed a professional contract with Saracens.

After spending time on loan in the national leagues Whiteley made his first start for Saracens on 13 April 2019, scoring a try in a 23-21 defeat to Bristol Bears.

In January 2021, it was confirmed Whitley would join Bristol Bears ahead of the 2021–22 season.

On January 23 2023 Whiteley to leave Bears with immediate effect to join Leicester Tigers.

References

1995 births
Living people
Saracens F.C. players
English rugby union players
Rugby union players from Kensington
Rugby union scrum-halves
People educated at Millfield
Leicester Tigers players